Holzrichter is a surname. Notable people with the surname include:

John Holzrichter, American physicist
William Holzrichter (1922–2005), American table tennis player

See also
Holzrichter Glacier, a glacier of the Ross Dependency, Antarctica